The Derbyshire Spartans are an English basketball club, based in the town of Ripley, South Derbyshire.

Home venue
The Spartans play their home National League games at the Repton School in nearby Repton. The arena has capacity for 250 spectators.

Season-by-season records

References

Basketball teams in England
Basketball teams established in 2012
National Basketball League (England)
2012 establishments in England
Organisations based in Derbyshire